Route 570 is a one-mile (1.6 km) road that stretches from Route 56 in Lihue to Lihue Airport on the island of Kauai. Before the construction of Route 51 in the 1980s, the road provided primary access to Lihue Airport with the north and eastern shores of the Kauai.

Route description 

Following the intersection with Hawaii Route 56, Hawaii Route 570 the heads east and comes to a major intersection with Hawaii Route 51.  Hawaii Route 570 then enters into the property of Lihue Airport and makes a complete route around the terminal entrance with access to car rental areas and private hangars also.

Major intersections

External links

Route Log for Hawaii Route 570

Transportation in Kauai County, Hawaii
 0570